Rasta City is one of two major gangs in Trinidad and Tobago. Their rival gang is the Muslims.

In July 2019, Rasta City leader Akini "Dole" Adams was killed during a police raid in Sea Lots.

In the summer of 2019, musicians Marlon Asher (Marlon Sobers), Izac King (Shaquille Selkridge) and Orlando Octave released a single named "UniTTy" calling for both sides of the war to learn the truth of their faiths and end their gangland killings.

References

Gangs in Trinidad and Tobago